Glossodoris kahlbrocki is a species of sea slug, a dorid nudibranch, a shell-less marine gastropod mollusk in the family Chromodorididae.

Distribution 
The type locality for this species is Dahara Wadi Gimal, near Hurghada, Egypt, Red Sea.

Description
This distinctive species has a white body with a narrow bright blue rim to the mantle which grades to dark blue at the edge. The rhinophores and gills are also white, with the inner faces of the gills ochre.

References

Chromodorididae
Gastropods described in 2018